The American Solidarity Party (ASP) is a Christian-democratic political party in the United States. It was founded in 2011 and officially incorporated in 2016. The party has a Solidarity National Committee (SNC) and has numerous active state and local chapters. Brian Carroll was the party's nominee in the 2020 presidential election.

The American Solidarity Party has been characterized as socially conservative while supporting government intervention in economic matters. The ASP encourages social development along the lines of subsidiarity and sphere sovereignty, with a stated emphasis on "the importance of strong families, local communities, and voluntary associations". It favors fiscally progressive policies and a social market economy with a distributist character, that seeks "widespread economic participation and ownership" and providing a social safety net program.

Names and symbols 
The party's original name was inspired by its European counterparts, the Polish trade union Solidarity, and the current one reflects its more developed ideology and focus in the years since.

The ASP mascot is the pelican, a traditional symbol of charity. The party's political color is orange, like other Christian-democratic political parties.

On social media, ASP members use the orange heart emoji to denote their "whole-life ethic" and Christian democratic influences, similar to the rose emoji's use as a symbol for the Democratic Socialists of America.

Members of the American Solidarity Party use the demonym 'Solidarist' to refer to themselves.

History 

The ASP was founded in 2011 as the Christian Democratic Party USA (CDPUSA). In 2012, the CDPUSA endorsed the independent candidacy of Joe Schriner for president. In December 2020, the American Solidarity Party joined the board of the Coalition for Free and Open Elections (COFOE).

Ideology 
The American Solidarity Party largely adheres to the ideology of Christian democracy, which has been influenced by Catholic social teaching, Neo-Calvinist theology and the social teachings espoused by other traditions of Christianity in various parts of the world. As such, the ASP looks to the Christian democratic movements in Europe and the Americas. 

The American Solidarity Party has been characterized as conservative on social issues while supporting government intervention in economic matters, making it communitarian.

Social issues 
The American Solidarity Party opposes abortion, euthanasia, and capital punishment on the basis of the sanctity of human life. It views the traditional, heterosexual family as being central to society.

Economic issues 
The American Solidarity Party supports a universal healthcare system as well as an economy containing widespread distribution of productive property, in particular increased worker ownership and management of their production.

Foreign policy issues 
The American Solidarity Party is noninterventionist in its foreign policy, using peace as its guiding principle. It supports foreign aid and nonviolent diplomacy, while opposing violent military action as a means to resolve conflicts.

Influences 
Daniel Silliman writes that the American Solidarity Party, as with other Christian-democratic political parties, draws from Catholic social teaching and Neo-Calvinist theology. In the same vein, David McPherson says that the American Solidarity Party "affirm[s] ... the full spectrum of Catholic social teaching (namely, the teachings regarding the sanctity of human life, the common good, subsidiarity, religious freedom, solidarity, etc.)," contrasting the ASP to both the Republican Party and the Democratic Party, each of which recognizes only some of these items. Its strongest support is in California, Ohio, and Texas, according to the Madera Tribune (of Madera, California).

Elections

2016

Presidential election 
During the 2016 presidential election season, the American Solidarity Party held an online convention on July 9, 2016, which nominated Amir Azarvan of Georgia for president and Mike Maturen of Michigan for vice-president. However, Azarvan subsequently withdrew, and in response the ticket was revised, with Maturen running for president and Juan Muñoz of Texas running for vice-president.

For the 2016 election, the American Solidarity Party was listed on the ballot in Colorado. It was a certified write-in option in Alabama, California, Georgia, Iowa, Kansas, Kentucky, Maryland, Michigan, Minnesota, New Hampshire, New Jersey, Ohio, Oregon, Pennsylvania, Rhode Island, Texas, Vermont, and Washington. Maturen received 6,697 reported votes, not including states that did not report votes for him.

2017 

For the November 2017 off-year elections, the American Solidarity Party ran a candidate for New Jersey legislature, Monica Sohler, in the 6th district. She received 821 votes.

2018 
Desmond Silveira, a software engineer, was a national committee member of the American Solidarity Party, served as the campaign manager for the Maturen-Muñoz 2016 campaign, the vice chair of the ASP, and the director of operations for the party. In 2018, he ran for governor, receiving 4,633 votes in the primary election.

Brian T. Carroll ran against Devin Nunes for California's 22nd congressional district receiving 1,591 votes in the primary election.

2020 
Shane Ian Hoffman ran as the ASP's candidate in Ohio's 15th Congressional District. He did not make the ballot and was a write-in candidate.

Presidential election 

In the 2020 U.S. presidential election, Brian Carroll, Joe Schriner, and Joshua Perkins announced their candidacies for the ASP nomination. Carroll was declared the winner of the nomination on September 9, 2019.

For the 2020 election, the American Solidarity Party was on the ballot in Arkansas, Colorado, Guam, Illinois, Louisiana, Mississippi, Rhode Island, Vermont and Wisconsin.

It was a certified write-in option in 
Alabama, 
Alaska,
California,
Connecticut,
Delaware, 
Florida, 
Georgia, 
Idaho, 
Indiana, 
Iowa, 
Kansas,
Kentucky,
Maryland,
Massachusetts, 
Michigan,
Minnesota,
Missouri,
Nebraska,
New Hampshire, 
New Jersey, 
New York, 
North Dakota, 
Ohio, 
Oregon, 
Pennsylvania, 
Tennessee, 
Texas, 
Utah,
Virginia,
Washington, and 
Wyoming.

2021 
Benjamin Schmitz ran for state senate in the Wisconsin 13th state senate district in the April 6th legislative special election. Stephen Hollenberg ran for a state house seat in the Merrimack, New Hampshire special election on April 13, 2021.

California gubernatorial recall election 
Dr. James G Hanink was endorsed by the American Solidarity Party for the 2021 California gubernatorial recall election. He hosts the Open Door podcast and is the president of the American Maritain Association. Dr. Hanink is a frequent contributor to the New Oxford Review and spent four decades dedicated to teaching at Loyola Marymount University and published papers in the areas of metaphysics, epistemology, and social thought. Hanink received 7,193 votes, 0.01% of all votes, an increase in both raw votes and percentage from Silveira's 2018 gubernatorial run.

2022 
Dr. James G. Hanink ran again for governor of California in 2022. He received 10,110 votes.

Dr. Mark A. Ruzon ran as a write-in candidate for U.S. Senate in California, receiving 206 votes.

Desmond A. Silveira ran as a write-in candidate for California Secretary of State, receiving 235 votes.

Erskine L. Levi ran for U.S. Congress as a write-in candidate in California's 31st congressional district, receiving 17 votes.

Dr. Jacqueline Abernathy ran for governor of Texas as a write-in candidate, receiving 1,326 votes.

Solidarity National Committee member Dr. Tyler Martin ran for governor of Nebraska. Nebraska does not report write-in votes separately.

Oliver Black ran for U.S. Congress in Washington's 3rd congressional district. receiving 451 votes.

The party endorsed Democratic candidate and And Campaign co-founder Pastor Chris Butler for U.S. Congress in Illinois's 1st congressional district. He was elimination in the Democratic primary, receiving 3,707 votes.

The Utah state party endorsed Independent Senate candidate Evan McMullin in the 2022 Utah Senate Election. He was also endorsed by the Democratic Party and received 272,477 votes.

2024

Presidential election 
For the 2024 election, the American Solidarity Party will be on the ballot in Arkansas.

Presidential tickets

Presidential election ballot access and results

Notable party supporters 
 Stephen Bainbridge, UCLA law professor
 Charles A. Coulombe, Catholic author, historian, and lecturer
Patrick Deneen, author of Why Liberalism Failed, member of ASP board of advisors
 Rod Dreher, senior editor and blogger at The American Conservative and author of several books, including How Dante Can Save Your Life and The Benedict Option
 Terry Mattingly, journalist, author, and professor
 Brian Carroll, former ASP presidential candidate
 Mike Maturen, former ASP presidential candidate
 Joe Schriner, former ASP presidential candidate
 George Yancey, sociologist and professor of sociology at Baylor University
 Howard Ahmanson Jr., philanthropist and writer

See also 
 Center for Public Justice
 Communitarianism
 Social market economy
 Social conservatism in the United States
 Social Gospel
 Sphere sovereignty
 Subsidiarity
 Third Way

Notes

References

External links 
 

2011 establishments in the United States
Anti-abortion organizations in the United States
Anti–death penalty organizations in the United States
Christian democratic parties in the United States
Conservative parties in the United States
Distributism
Healthcare reform advocacy groups in the United States
Immigration political advocacy groups in the United States
Political parties in the United States
Progressive parties in the United States
Social conservative parties
Syncretic political movements